Mylapore,  is a neighborhood in the central part of the city of Chennai, India.

Mylapore may also refer to:

 Mylapore (state assembly constituency)
 Mylapore taluk
 Mylapore (Corporation zone)